Tanadgusix Corporation or TDX is a shareholder-owned Aleut Alaska Native village corporation founded in 1973. Located on Saint Paul Island, Alaska, the company is primarily involved in fish processing, shipping, real estate, tourism, the environment and power generation.

In 1971 the U.S. government settlement of Alaska Native land claims created the Alaska Native Claims Settlement Act corporations, including TDX.

TDX owns over 95% of Saint Paul Island and all or part of the fish processing industry, hotel, cable television, and tourism businesses.

TDX Foundation 
The TDX Foundation is the non-profit arm of Tanadgusix Corporation.

TDX Power 
TDX Power is a power production and distribution company with a hybrid wind-diesel power plant in Saint Paul (the largest hybrid wind-diesel power plant in Alaska), a 4-MW Cat diesel power plant in Sand Point, Alaska, and a 10-MW diesel and natural gas power plant on the North Slope in Deadhorse.

External links

 BeringSea.com, a community site run by Tanadgusix
 Tanadgusix (TDX) Home
 TDX Power Home
  Bering Sea Eccotech Home
 St. Paul Island Tours Home
 Interview with Ron Philemonoff of TDX Power by the U.S. Department of Energy

1973 establishments in Alaska
Alaska Native village corporations
Aleut
Aleutians West Census Area, Alaska
Conglomerate companies established in 1973